USS Chippewa may refer to:

USS Chippewa (1813), was a schooner captured in 1813 from British forces, which later burned the ship in the same year.
 was a 106-gun ship of the line for which construction began after the signing of a contract 15 December 1814, but the ship was never launched. Uncompleted, the ship was sold 1 November 1833.
 , was a brig under the direction of Commodore Oliver Perry.  The ship ran aground on an uncharted reef in the Bahamas and sank 12 December 1816.
, was a wooden screw steamer gunboat launched in 1861 and active in the American Civil War, then sold in 1865.
 was an ocean tug commissioned in 1943 and decommissioned in 1947. She was sunk in 1990 in Florida to serve as an artificial reef.

United States Navy ship names